Voortrekkers can also refer to the historical mass migration of the Afrikaner people: see Voortrekkers.

The Voortrekkers is an Afrikaner youth organisation founded in South Africa in 1931.

Mission, values and principles
In the words of its mission statement (as translated), "The Voortrekkers empowers the Afrikaners to be successful as positive citizens and dependable Christians."

The motto of the movement, "Hou Koers", translates as "Hold [your] Course". The values of the organisation are encapsulated in what is referred to as "The ABC".

The ABC

Afrikanerskap (Being an Afrikaner)
Burgerskap (Citizenship)
Christenskap (Christianity).

The ten principles that guide the members of the movement are:
 A Voortrekker believes in the triune God.
 A Voortrekker practices a Christian lifestyle.
 A Voortrekker accepts authority placed over him or her.
 A Voortrekker keeps the language and culture of the Afrikaners in honour.
 A Voortrekker takes the good from the past and builds the future thereupon.
 A Voortrekker studies, appreciates and protects our environment.
 A Voortrekker is a contributing citizen.
 A Voortrekker is a true leader.
 A Voortrekker is observant and vigilant.
 A Voortrekker has the positive habit of helping people and providing voluntary service.

History

1913-1940
The founding of the Voortrekkers coincided with a growth in Afrikaner nationalism in South Africa, then a member of the British Commonwealth. In some ways the Voortrekker organisation represents an Afrikaans-language alternative to the largely English-speaking Boy Scout movement, with its British heritage.

Dr. C. F. Visser formulated the original concept of a youth movement amongst Afrikaners in 1913 in Bloemfontein. Dr. Visser appealed to the directors of the  Boy Scout movement (founded in 1907 and spreading to South Africa from 1908) to allow the incorporation of the Voortrekkers into the "broader church" under one umbrella, but this venture failed. The Scouts were in the main speakers of English, and differences about the role of language led to difficulties. There were further complications hinging upon religious declarations or beliefs, and no agreement could be reached. The values and principles of the Voortrekker organisation were perceived, at the time, to be more nationalistic and religious in tone than those of the Scouting Movement programme.

In 1920 the first "Kommando" of the Voortrekkers (English equivalent:  "Troop") was established in Bloemfontein at the Central High School. In 1923 two more kommandos started - in Graaf Reinet (led by "Oom Japie Heese") and in Nieuwoudtville (with "Oom Laubie" as leader). (Note: the term Oom in Afrikaans ("Uncle") is, amongst other things, an honorific and is equivalent to the "Colonel" in "Colonel Sanders" of KFC).

The official establishment of the Voortrekker movement dates from 30 September 1931. (This is distinct from the early endeavours of the informal movement established by Dr. C. F. Visser (also called "Vader (Father) Visser", seen as the father of the movement)). Dr.  became the first "Hoofleier" (Chief leader) of the movement. Gen. J.B.M. Hertzog welcomed the first official Voortrekkers in the movement.

In 1939 the Voortrekkers took part in the laying of the foundation stone at the Voortrekker Monument in Pretoria. Voortrekkers and other Afrikaners celebrated this event widely, walking with burning torches in many locations in South Africa.

1940-1959
In 1940, Dr. C. F. Visser became the leader of the Voortrekkers. The members of the organisation celebrated the completion of the Voortrekker Monument in 1949. They also contributed to the festival of van Riebeeck in Cape Town in 1952, where the arrival of Jan van Riebeeck in Table Bay in 1652 was commemorated.

1959-1966
Dr. J. de V. Heese (“Oom Japie”) became the new leader of the Voortrekkers in 1959. He had previously served as the General Secretary of the movement. Heese died in 1966.

1966-1981
In 1966, “Oom Badie Badenhorst”, was elected as leader of the Voortrekkers. During his term of office the Voortrekkers contributed to the inauguration of the monument at Bloedrivier between 13–17 December 1971 as well as the inauguration of the Taalmonument (Afrikaans language monument) in Paarl on 10 October 1975.  The first “President's Verkenners” received their badges from State President C. R. Swart.

1981-1989
Prof. C. W. J. (“Oom Carel”) Boshoff was the leader during this period. This was a time of serious discord and argument among Afrikaners about Apartheid. Some believed that Apartheid was right and others felt that it was wrong. These upheavals were bound to affect the Voortrekker movement in the end.

1989-1997
Ds. (Reverend) J. P. L. (“Oom Johan”) van der Walt was elected as leader for the Voortrekkers in 1989. The Voortrekkers started to transform the movement in 1989, adapting its constitution for a changing South Africa.

1997-2001
At the Voortrekker’s national congress at Hartenbos in 1997, Prof Tom Dreyer was elected as new leader until 2001. During his term, the old-fashioned and formal uniform, was replaced with a modern Voortrekker uniform.

2001-2013
During the congress of 2001 in Pretoria, the eighth leader of the Voortrekker, Prof. T. P. Strauss (“oom Piet”) was elected.

Constant adaptations were made, and are still made, to transform the Voortrekkers to a more modern youth movement for Afrikaners.

At the congress of 2005, Prof Strauss was once again elected as leader for the next four years. In 2009 he was again elected as the leader of the Voortrekkers.

2013-current
At the 2013 congress, Dr Danie Langner was elected as the new Voortrekker leader. Dr Langner is also the Managing Director of the FAK ( Federation of Afrikaans Cultural Associations) as of 2012.

Organisation
Organisationally, the Voortrekkers are divided into a number of gebiede (areas) which correspond to the old pre-1994 South African provinces plus Namibia, which in turn are subdivided into oorde (districts) and then kommandos (commandos). Each kommando consists of a number of spanne (teams).

Membership levels
At primary-school level (ages 5–12), members are known as Penkoppe (boys) and Drawwertjies (girls); the emphasis at this stage is to develop personal leadership qualities.

In high school (ages 13–17), members are referred to as Verkenners (scouts) and its emphasis is to continue what was learned in the earlier primary-school phase by applying its lessons to developing general leadership skills.

Young adult members (ages 18–30) are known as Staatmakers (dependables), with the program emphasising training for leadership positions at its several levels of organisation.

See also
Ernest George Jansen

External links

Afrikaner organizations
Society of South Africa
Youth organisations based in South Africa
Youth organizations established in 1931
1931 establishments in South Africa